Limerick Greyhound Stadium is a greyhound racing track located in south-west Limerick in Ireland.

The stadium has a grandstand restaurant, hospitality suites, fast food facilities and a number of bars. Racing takes place on a Thursday (6:30pm) and Saturday (7.30pm).

History
In 2009 the old Markets Field Greyhound Stadium just off the Garryowen Road was closed to enable a new greyhound track to replace it. The new site chosen was the former horse racing course at Greenpark and in 2008 the area underwent significant change.

When the stadium was completed to the tune of €18 million at Greenpark, Dock Road it impressed all within the industry. The official opening night was on 22 October 2010 and the stadium has a capacity attendance of 2,900 including a 190-seat grandstand restaurant called the Leger Restaurant after a major event held at the track. Private hospitality suites and gallery bars were also constructed one of which is named after Markets Field Stadium.

The previously mentioned St Leger which was first held at the old Limerick Stadium in 1940   and is an original classic race was duly switched to the new track and continues to be contested. The  Kirby Memorial Stakes is also held here and boasted a record €80,000 to the winner in 2014. It was sponsored by J. P. McManus who had close ties with the old Limerick track.

The track is owned and operated by Greyhound Racing Ireland (formerly the Irish Greyhound Board) and they have their headquarters on site.

Competitions

Current
St Leger
Kirby Memorial Stakes

Former
Oaks (1942)

Track records
Current
  

Former

References

Greyhound racing venues in the Republic of Ireland
Sport in Limerick (city)
Sport in County Limerick
Sports venues in County Limerick
2010 establishments in Ireland